Nut Tree Airport  is a county-owned public-use airport located two nautical miles (3.7 km) northeast of the central business district of Vacaville, in Solano County, California, United States.

The airport is near the junction of Interstates 80 and 505. It is adjacent to the Nut Tree retail/commercial development, which replaced a historic US 40 highway stop from which both derive their name.

Facilities and aircraft 
It has one runway designated 2/20 with an asphalt surface measuring 4,700 by 75 feet (1,433 x 23 m).

For the 12-month period ending March 3, 1995, the airport had 101,500 aircraft operations, an average of 278 per day: 98.5% general aviation and 1.5% air taxi. At that time there were 180 aircraft based at this airport: 90% single-engine, 8% multi-engine and 2% jet.

History 
The Nut Tree Airport was founded in 1955 by Ed Power Jr., an aviation enthusiast and the son of Nut Tree founders Ed "Bunny" Power Sr. and Helen Harbison Power, as a way of attracting aviators to the Nut Tree.

Gallery

References

External links 

 
 Nut Tree Airport Official Site
 Nut Tree Airport at Solano County's web site
 Nut Tree Airport at Solano Pilots Association
 Nut Tree Airport Forum at Solano Pilots Association
 Aerial image as of 16 June 1993 from USGS The National Map
 

  Source for O45 former code.

Airports in Solano County, California
Buildings and structures in Vacaville, California
Airports established in 1955
1955 establishments in California